Viscount Vane was a title in the Peerage of Ireland. It was created in 1720 for the Honourable William Vane, who had previously represented County Durham in Parliament and who later sat for Steyning and Kent. He was created Baron Vane, of Dungannon in the County of Tyrone, also in the Peerage of Ireland, at the same time he was given the viscountcy. Vane was the younger son of the Christopher Vane, 1st Baron Barnard (see Baron Barnard for earlier history of the family). The titles became extinct on the death of his only surviving son, the second Viscount, in 1789.

Viscounts Vane (1720)
William Vane, 1st Viscount Vane (1682–1734)
Hon. Christopher Vane (1704–1721)
Hon. John Vane (1707–1724)
William Holles Vane, 2nd Viscount Vane (1714–1789)

See also
Baron Barnard
Earl of Darlington
Duke of Cleveland
Baron Inglewood

References

Extinct viscountcies in the Peerage of Ireland
Viscount
Noble titles created in 1720